The shuangshou jian is a Chinese two-handed double-edged straight sword (jian). Historically, shuangshou jian were up to 1.6 meters (65") in length, and the two-handed grip could be used as a lever to lock the opponent's arm if necessary. Large ring pommels are prevalent in the construction of shuangshou jian.

Chinese swords
Weapons of China